Turkish Airlines Flight 278, operated by a Boeing 737-4Y0 registered TC-JES and named Mersin, was a domestic scheduled flight from Ankara Esenboğa Airport to Van Ferit Melen Airport in eastern Turkey that crashed on 29 December 1994 during its final approach to land in driving snow. Five of the seven crew and 52 of the 69 passengers lost their lives, while two crew members and 17 passengers survived with serious injuries.

Aircraft
The aircraft, a Boeing 737-400 with two CFMI CFM56-3C1 jet engines, was built by Boeing with manufacturer serial number 26074/2376, and made its first flight on 25 September 1992.
The captain was Adem Ungun, and the first officer was Yavuz AlicI.

Crash

It was the deadliest aviation accident involving a Boeing 737-400 at that time. It was subsequently surpassed by Adam Air Flight 574 which crashed on 1 January 2007 with 102 fatalities, and fourth deadliest aircraft accident in Turkey at that time.

Victims
The aircraft had a crew of 7 and 69 passengers including two babies. Two of the crew and 17 passengers survived the crash with serious injuries.

See also
 List of accidents and incidents involving airliners by airline

References

Aviation accidents and incidents in 1994
Aviation accidents and incidents in Turkey
1994 in Turkey
278
Airliner accidents and incidents involving controlled flight into terrain
Accidents and incidents involving the Boeing 737 Classic
Airliner accidents and incidents caused by pilot error
Airliner accidents and incidents caused by weather
History of Van Province
1994 meteorology
December 1994 events in Europe